This article provides a summary of significant events in 1820 in birding and ornithology. Notable occurrences in 1820 include the first description of the yellow-legged tinamou, and the commencement of ornithologist William John Swainson's Zoological Illustrations, a work including illustrations of many birds.

Events
Heinrich Kuhl travels in Java collecting birds for the collections in Leiden
Heinrich Kuhl publishes . Bonn (also in Nova Acta Acad. Caes. Leop.-Carol. Nat. Cur. Vol.X). In this work he described many new parrot species. Among them are the red-capped parrot, the white-bellied parrot the Un-cape parrot, the vulturine parrot the short-tailed parrot the western rosella the blue-winged parrot  the scaly-breasted lorikeet the scaly-headed parrot the golden-tailed parrotlet the northern rosella the  black-collared lovebird and the vinaceous-breasted amazon
Prince Maximilian of Wied-Neuwied describes the yellow-legged tinamou
Leach's storm petrel named after William Elford Leach by Coenraad Jacob Temminck without Temminck being aware that it had previously been described by Vieillot
Short-toed treecreeper named by Christian Ludwig Brehm
William John Swainson commences Zoological Illustrations (1820–23)
Coenraad Jacob Temminck commences . New species described in this work in 1820 include the rufous-vented ground cuckoo, the cinereous antshrike, the northern white-faced owl, the olivaceous flatbill, the streaky-breasted honeyeater, Verreaux's eagle-owl and the Timor blue flycatcher
Rijksmuseum van Natuurlijke Historie established

Deaths
19 June - Joseph Banks (born 1743)
9 August - Anders Sparrman (born 1748)

References

Birding and ornithology by year
1820 in science